Horná Lehota may refer to several places in Slovakia.

Horná Lehota, Brezno District
Horná Lehota, Dolný Kubín District